Periodic elections for the Tasmanian Legislative Council were held on 3 May 2014. The two seats up for election were the electoral division of Huon and the electoral division of Rosevears. These seats were last contested in 2008.

Huon
Independent MLC Paul Harriss held Huon from 1996. In 2014, Harriss resigned from the Legislative Council to successfully contest the Tasmanian House of Assembly seat of Franklin as a Liberal candidate at the 2014 state election. The favourite prior to the election was Peter Hodgman, the uncle of Premier Will Hodgman who had previously held the seat as an independent from 1974 to 1986 before serving in the House of Assembly as a Liberal from 1986 to 2001. Hodgman was running as a Liberal candidate. His highest profile opponent was Huon Valley Mayor Robert Armstrong, running as an independent. Other candidates included Liz Smith, a Huon Valley councillor who resigned from the Greens to run as an independent; Jimmy Bell, the manager of the Huon Valley Police and Citizens Youth Club; Rodney Dillon, an Amnesty International worker who was the 2013 Tasmanian Humanitarian of the Year; Pavel Ruzicka, a sawmiller; and Helen Lane.

The results are final.

Rosevears
Independent MLC Kerry Finch has represented Rosevears since 2002. He re-contested the seat. The Liberal Party endorsed Don Morris, a long-time political staffer and former Senate candidate, in a break from their tradition of not challenging sitting independents. The Liberal Party targeted Finch as a "closet Green" regarding his left-leaning voting record. No other candidates nominated.

These results are final.

References

2014 elections in Australia
Elections in Tasmania
2010s in Tasmania
May 2014 events in Australia